Kirchschläger, sometimes also spelled Kirchschlaeger or Kirchschlager, is a German surname. Notable people with this surname include:

 Angelika Kirchschlager (born 1965), Austrian mezzo-soprano
 Herma Kirchschläger (1916-2009), Austrian first lady
 Rudolf Kirchschläger (1915–2000), Austrian politician